EVV might refer to:

EVV Echt, Dutch football club
Evansville Regional Airport, American airport
EVV Eindhoven, the former name of the Dutch football club FC Eindhoven